Robert Burt Gookin (23 June 1914 – 21 December 2002) was the first CEO of the H. J. Heinz Company from outside the Heinz family. He joined the firm in 1945 and retired in 1979.

References

1914 births
2002 deaths
Harvard Business School alumni
Northwestern University alumni
American chief executives of food industry companies